Singam or Singham is both a surname and a given name that means "lion" in the Tamil language. Notable people with the name include:

Archibald W. Singham (1932-1991), Sri Lankan political scientist and historian
Constance Singam (born 1936), Singaporean activist and writer
Neville Roy Singham (born 1954), American businessman
Singam Singh (born 1988), Indian footballer

References